Humberto Ríos Labrada is a Cuban folk musician, agricultural scientist and environmentalist. He was awarded the Goldman Environmental Prize in 2010, for his work for biodiversity and sustainable development of Cuban agriculture.

References 

Year of birth missing (living people)
Living people
People from Havana
Cuban scientists
Cuban environmentalists
Cuban musicians
Goldman Environmental Prize awardees